Tharri   is a town in the Larkana District in Sindh, Pakistan. The city is well connected with the other large cities like Karachi, the provincial capital and Larkana. The city is located at 26°57'10N 67°38'30E with an altitude of 24 metres (82 feet).

See also
 Soomra Dynasty
 Larkana

References

Larkana District